Frisilia ceylonica is a moth in the family Lecithoceridae. It was described by Kyu-Tek Park in 2001. It is found in Sri Lanka.

The wingspan is 12.5–13 mm. The forewings are pale orange, with dark brown scales scattered irregularly, more dense along the costa at the basal one-fifth, the termen and near the inner margin. There is also a dark brown discal spot near the middle of the cell, a short dark brown streak below the end of the cell and two rows of setae-like scales along both sides of the plical line below the cell, the upper one extended near three-fourths and the lower one reaching the termen. The hindwings are pale grey.

References

Moths described in 2001
Frisilia